Joseph Backaert (5 August 1921 – 12 June 1997) was a Belgian football midfielder who was a member of the Belgium national team at the 1954 FIFA World Cup. However, he never earned a cap for Belgium. He also played for R. Olympic Charleroi C.C.

References

External links
FIFA profile

1921 births
1997 deaths
Belgian footballers
Association football midfielders
R. Charleroi S.C. players
1954 FIFA World Cup players
Footballers from Liège